The 2007–08 Deutsche Eishockey Liga season was the 14th season since the founding of the Deutsche Eishockey Liga (DEL). Fifteen teams played after the Grizzly Adams Wolfsburg received the license and were admitted to play in the DEL. Each club played the other four times, resulting in 56 regular-season games per club. The top six clubs at the end of the regular season qualified for the first round of the play-offs. The clubs seven to ten played a preliminary round to determine the last two places for the first round. For the teams placed eleven to fifteen, the season ended. No club was relegated from the DEL in this season.

The Eisbären Berlin won their third championship in four years.

Regular season
The final table operates under the following points system: Three points for a win, two for a win after overtime or penalties, one for a loss after overtime or penalties and no points for an outright loss.

GP = Games Played, W = Wins, OTW = Overtime win, SOW = Shootout win, OTL = Overtime loss, SOL = Shootout loss, L = Loss
Color code:  = Direct Playoff qualification,  = Playoff qualification round,  = No playoff

Playoffs
The four rounds of the 2007-08 play-offs were played under the following system:
 Preliminary round: Best-of-three
 First round: Best-of-seven
 Semi finals: Best-of-five
 Finals: Best-of-five
Unlike the regular season, in the play-offs games will not be decided by penalty shoot-outs but in overtime (OT) sudden-death. In all play-off rounds the higher placed team from the regular season has home advantage in the uneven numbered games (Game 1, 3, 5, 7) and the other team in the even numbered games (Game 2, 4, 6).

Qualifying round
Qualifications

RS = Regular season; OT = Overtime

Quarterfinals

Semi finals

Finals

Top scorers

DEL
DEL
Deutsche Eishockey Liga seasons